"Out of Sight, Out of Mind" is a song by the British group Level 42. It was released as the first single from the album, Standing in the Light, reaching No. 41 in the UK charts in April 1983.

Charts

Personnel
Mark King - bass and vocals
Mike Lindup - keyboards and vocals
Boon Gould - guitars
Phil Gould - drums and vocals
Wally Badarou - keyboards

References

1983 songs
1983 singles
Level 42 songs
Songs written by Phil Gould (musician)
Songs written by Mark King (musician)
Songs written by Mike Lindup
Songs written by Boon Gould
Polydor Records singles